Government General Degree College, Singur, established in 2013, is the government degree college in the Hooghly district. It offers undergraduate courses in science and arts(Honours degree only). The college is affiliated with the University of Burdwan.

Departments

Science

Physics
Chemistry
Mathematics
Computer Science
Anthropology
Botany
Zoology
Psychology

Arts

Bengali
English
History
Philosophy
Sanskrit
Political Science
Psychology
Sociology
Santhali

See also

References

External links
Singur Government General Degree College

Universities and colleges in Hooghly district
Colleges affiliated to University of Burdwan
Educational institutions established in 2013
2013 establishments in West Bengal
Government colleges in West Bengal